Fohs Hall in Marion, Kentucky was built in 1926.  It was listed on the National Register of Historic Places in 1982.

It was built to serve as a community center for Marion and was a donation of Ferdinand Julius Fohs, a notable petroleum geologist who grew up in Marion.  Architects Frankel and Curtis of Lexington, Kentucky, designed the building, which was built at cost of $73,081 on the site of the small house where Fohs had lived.   Fohs donated it to the Marion Board of Education to serve as a community center and as an auxiliary building for Marion High School, which was located across the street.   The building included a music room, a lounge, a study hall, a small library, classrooms, and an auditorium.

It is a two-story brick building on a  limestone foundation.  It has a recessed center bay in its front, north-facing facade, topped by a stone pediment supported by four Corinthian columns.

Fohs formed a geological firm, Fohs and Gardner, with James H. Gardner as partner.  Fohs is credited with helping discover the Mexia oil field in 1920.

References

School buildings on the National Register of Historic Places in Kentucky
Neoclassical architecture in Kentucky
Government buildings completed in 1926
National Register of Historic Places in Crittenden County, Kentucky
1926 establishments in Kentucky
Education in Crittenden County, Kentucky
Community centers in Kentucky